The Galloway Boys, also known as the Galloway Gang or G-Way, are a gang based in Southern Ontario, Canada, mainly in the Toronto suburb of Scarborough. They were founded in  Scarborough in the early 2000s. Originally a group of friends who banded together to sell drugs, the Galloway Boys are now responsible for gang violence in Scarborough, such as the Danzig Street shooting. Historically, members have been primarily of Black Canadian heritage.

References

 

Gangs in Toronto